Modern equipment of the Turkish Land Forces. Totals in these tables do not necessarily accurately reflect combat attrition sustained during the ongoing Syrian-Turkish clashes and Kurdish–Turkish conflict.

Infantry weapons

Handguns

Shotguns

Submachine guns and personal defence weapons

Assault and battle rifles

Sniper and anti-materiel rifles

Machine guns

Anti-armor weapons

Grenade launchers

Man-portable air-defense system (MANPADS)

Grenades and mines

Infantry mortars

Protective gear

Vehicles and artillery

Tanks

Armoured vehicles

Rockets and artillery

Anti-aircraft and anti-drone warfare
Most of the anti-aircraft equipment is in the inventory of Turkish Air Force.

Engineering vehicles and equipment

Utility vehicles

Cargo vehicles

Unmanned ground vehicles

Laser weapons

Radar systems 
These are radars in Turkish Land Forces command. For other radars see List of active weapons of the Turkish Air Force.

Electronic warfare systems

Aircraft

Unmanned aerial vehicles

Helicopters

Fixed-wing aircraft

Future procurements

Retired or reserve equipment kept in storage

See also 
 Coast Guard Command (Turkey)#Equipment
 Military equipment of Turkey

References

External links
See the Turkish Government, Undersecretariat for Defense Industries website for an official list of Turkish military procurement projects.

Military equipment of Turkey
Turkish Land Forces
Turkish military-related lists
Turkish Land Forces